Kathleen Saliba (born 30 August 1978) is a Maltese former footballer who played as a forward. She has been a member of the Malta women's national team.

References

1978 births
Living people
Women's association football forwards
Maltese women's footballers
Malta women's international footballers